AECI Limited is a South African chemicals group and is listed on the JSE Securities Exchange.

History
The company was registered as African Explosives and Industries  (AE&I) in 1924, with its headquarters in Johannesburg. It was formed as the result of a merger between the South African interests of Nobel Industries of the United Kingdom and the manufacturing arm of De Beers Consolidated Diamond Mines of Kimberley. The company's primary purpose was to provide blasting explosives and detonators to South African gold and diamond mines but AE&I was also the only South African producer of phosphatic fertilizer. In 1944 the company was renamed as African Explosives and Chemical Industries  (AECI). The company was listed on the JSE in 1966.

The AECI Group operates companies in the following market segments:
 Mining solutions (explosives and initiating systems)
 Specialty fibres
 Specialty chemicals
 Real Estate

AECI's principal manufacturing sites are located in the following cities in South Africa:
 Johannesburg (mining solutions and specialty chemicals)
 Sasolburg (specialty chemicals)
 Durban (specialty chemicals).

AECI is a specialty product and services group of companies which claims to provide "value-adding solutions to customers through science, technology and industry knowledge".  The focus is on serving the mining and manufacturing sectors.  The Dulux decorative coatings business was disposed of in 2007 and the unprofitable segments of the SANS Fibres business were closed.

Construction is in progress on five projects related mainly to the mining sector, with capital expenditure of about R1.1 billion in total over the next two years.

AECI’s core businesses serve both global and regional markets.  

Both African Explosives and Chemical Services have expanded their presence throughout sub-Saharan Africa.  The DetNet joint venture designs, produces and sells electronic detonators. In specialty chemicals a presence has been established in Brazil.

The realisation of land and the utilisation of built assets that have become surplus to AECI’s requirements are managed in the property portfolio, led by Heartland Properties.  These activities offer land holdings near Johannesburg and Cape Town for commercial, residential and industrial development and leasing purposes.  By the end of 2007, 14.5 square kilometres of the 37.7 square kilometres of excess land available had been sold.

At the end of 2007, AECI had 6000 employees, many of whom are engaged in the Group's sales, technical service and distribution networks.

Company structure
The AECI group of companies consists of:
 African Explosives Limited
 Improchem (Pty) Limited
 Chemical Initiatives (Pty) Limited
 DetNet (Pty) Limited 
 Acacia
 SANS Fibres (Pty) Limited

See also 
List of companies traded on the JSE
List of companies of South Africa
Economy of South Africa

References

External links
AECI Annual Report 2011
AECI website
DetNet website

Companies listed on the Johannesburg Stock Exchange
Manufacturing companies based in Johannesburg